Åke Carl Magnus Bergqvist (29 August 1900 – 7 March 1975) was a Swedish sailor who competed in the 1932 Summer Olympics.

In 1932, he was a crew member of the Swedish boat, Bissbi, which won the gold medal in the 6 metre class.

External links
profile

1900 births
1975 deaths
Swedish male sailors (sport)
Olympic sailors of Sweden
Sailors at the 1932 Summer Olympics – 6 Metre
Olympic gold medalists for Sweden
Olympic medalists in sailing

Medalists at the 1932 Summer Olympics